Craighead may refer to:

Surname
Alexander Craighead (1705–1766), Scots-Irish American preacher
Alison Craighead (born 1971), London-based visual artist
Brander Craighead (born 1990), Canadian football player
David Craighead (organist) (1924–2012), American organist
David Hope, Baron Hope of Craighead, KT FRSE PC (born 1938), former first Deputy President of the Supreme Court of the United Kingdom
Harold Craighead, American professor of applied and engineering physics at Cornell University in Ithaca, New York
Jane Elizabeth Sophia Engelhard Craighead, wife of Charles W. Engelhard, Jr., American businessman
John Craighead (born 1971), retired professional ice hockey right winger
Thomas Craighead (politician) (1798–1862), American politician and lawyer from the state of Arkansas
 Thomas B. Craighead (minister), American Presbyterian minister and educator
Frank C. Craighead Sr.  (1890–1982) American entomologist
Frank and John Craighead (born 1916), twin American naturalists and conservationists

Locations
Craighead County, Arkansas, county located in the U.S. state of Arkansas
Craighead Caverns, extensive cave system located in Sweetwater, Tennessee
Craighead-Jackson House, historic two-story, brick house in Knoxville, in the U.S. state of Tennessee

Maritime
USS Craighead (AK-175), Alamosa-class cargo ship commissioned by the U.S. Navy for service in World War II

See also
Craghead